William Martley (4 January 1824 – 6 February 1874) was the locomotive superintendent of the London Chatham and Dover Railway (LCDR) in England from 1860 until his death.

Biography
William was born in Ballyfallon, in County Meath, Ireland, in 1824. In 1841 he was articled to Daniel Gooch at the Swindon Works of the Great Western Railway, and in 1847 became locomotive superintendent of the Waterford, Limerick and Western Railway. He soon moved to the South Devon Railway, and then, in 1850, became locomotive superintendent of the South Wales Railway, based at Newport. In 1860 he moved to the London Chatham and Dover Railway, where he was the first locomotive superintendent. He became a member of the Institution of Civil Engineers in 1867, but died in office in February 1874.

London Chatham & Dover Railway 
During his period at the LCDR Martley established the Longhedge Railway Works (Battersea) 1860–1862 and used it for the construction of new locomotives, and the Stewarts Lane motive power depot.

Locomotives
According to D.L. Bradley, Martley's locomotives were "neat and attractive with a special charm of their own. In service they proved hard-working, reliable and above all, durable." His classes included 0-4-2 and 2-4-0 tank engines  and 2-4-0 tender locomotives.

References

External links
 steamindex.com
 Biography at gracesguide.co.uk

1824 births
1874 deaths
English railway mechanical engineers
Locomotive builders and designers
People from County Meath